is the railway station in Ōaza Magarikawa, Arita Town, Saga Prefecture. It is operated by Matsuura Railway and is on the Nishi-Kyūshū Line.

Lines 
Matsuura Railway
Nishi-Kyūshū Line

Adjacent stations

Station layout
The station is ground level with two platforms and two tracks.

Environs
National Route 202
Arita River
Zōshuku Post Office

History
August 7, 1898 - Opens for business by Imari Railway.
December 1, 1898 - Kyushu Railway merges Imari Railway.
July 1, 1907 - The Railroad Ministry nationalizes all lines of Kyushu Railway.
1913–Present station building is established. 
April 1, 1987 - Railways privatize and this station is inherited by JR Kyushu.
April 1, 1988 - This station is inherited by Matsuura Railway.

External links

Matsuura Railway (Japanese)

Railway stations in Japan opened in 1898
Railway stations in Saga Prefecture